Common sense (or simply sense) is sound, practical judgment concerning everyday matters, or a basic ability to perceive, understand, and judge in a manner that is shared by (i.e., "common to") nearly all people.

The everyday understanding of common sense derives from historical philosophical discussion involving several European languages. Related terms in other languages include Latin , Greek , and French , but these are not straightforward translations in all contexts. Similarly in English, there are different shades of meaning, implying more or less education and wisdom: "good sense" is sometimes seen as equivalent to "common sense", and sometimes not.

"Common sense" has at least two specific philosophical meanings. One is as a capability of the animal soul proposed by Aristotle to explain how the different senses join together and enable discrimination of particular objects by people and other animals. This common sense is distinct from basic sensory perception and from human rational thought, but cooperates with both.

A second philosophical use of the term is Roman-influenced and is used for the natural human sensitivity for other humans and the community. Just like the everyday meaning, both of these refer to a type of basic awareness and ability to judge that most people are expected to share naturally, even if they cannot explain why. All these meanings of "common sense", including the everyday ones, are interconnected in a complex history and have evolved during important political and philosophical debates in modern Western civilisation, notably concerning science, politics and economics. The interplay between the meanings has come to be particularly notable in English, as opposed to other western European languages, and the English term has become international.

Since the Age of Enlightenment the term "common sense" has been used for rhetorical effect both approvingly, as a standard for good taste and source of scientific and logical axioms, and disapprovingly, as equivalent to vulgar prejudice and superstition. It was at the beginning of the 18th century that this old philosophical term first acquired its modern English meaning: "Those plain, self-evident truths or conventional wisdom that one needed no sophistication to grasp and no proof to accept precisely because they accorded so well with the basic (common sense) intellectual capacities and experiences of the whole social body." This began with Descartes's criticism of it, and what came to be known as the dispute between "rationalism" and "empiricism". In the opening line of one of his most famous books, Discourse on Method, Descartes established the most common modern meaning, and its controversies, when he stated that everyone has a similar and sufficient amount of common sense, but it is rarely used well. Therefore, a skeptical logical method described by Descartes needs to be followed and common sense should not be overly relied upon. In the ensuing 18th century Enlightenment, common sense came to be seen more positively as the basis for modern thinking. Thomas Paine's polemical pamphlet Common Sense (1776) has been described as the most influential political pamphlet of the 18th century, affecting both the American and French revolutions. Today, the concept of common sense, and how it should best be used, remains linked to many of the most perennial topics in epistemology and ethics, with special focus often directed at the philosophy of the modern social sciences.

Aristotelian

The origin of the term is in the works of Aristotle. The best-known case is De Anima Book III, chapter 1, especially at line 425a27. The passage is about how the animal mind converts raw sense perceptions from the five specialized sense perceptions, into perceptions of real things moving and changing, which can be thought about. According to Aristotle's understanding of perception, each of the five senses perceives one type of "perceptible" or "sensible" which is specific to it. For example, sight can see colour. But Aristotle was explaining how the animal mind, not just the human mind, links and categorizes different tastes, colours, feelings, smells and sounds in order to perceive real things in terms of the "common sensibles" (or "common perceptibles"). In this discussion, "common" is a term opposed to specific or particular. Distinct combinations of these properties are common to all perceived things.

In this passage, Aristotle explained that concerning these  (such as movement) we already have a sense, a "common sense" or sense of the common things, which does not work by accident. As examples of perceiving by accident Aristotle mentions using the specific sense perception vision on its own to see that something is sweet, or to recognize a friend by their distinctive color.  explains that "when I see Socrates, it is not insofar as he is Socrates that he is visible to my eye, but rather because he is coloured". So the normal five individual senses do sense the common perceptibles according to Aristotle (and Plato), but it is not something they necessarily interpret correctly on their own. Aristotle proposes that the reason for having several senses is in fact that it increases the chances that we can distinguish and recognize things correctly, and not just occasionally or by accident. Each sense is used to identify distinctions, such as sight identifying the difference between black and white, but, says Aristotle, all animals with perception must have "some one thing" that can distinguish black from sweet. The common sense is where this comparison happens, and this must occur by comparing impressions (or symbols or markers) of what the specialist senses have perceived. The common sense is therefore also where a type of consciousness originates, "for it makes us aware of having sensations at all." And it receives physical picture imprints from the imaginative faculty, which are then memories that can be recollected.

The discussion was apparently intended to improve upon the account of Aristotle's friend and teacher Plato in his Socratic dialogue, the Theaetetus. But Plato's dialogue presented an argument that recognising  is an active thinking process in the rational part of the human soul, making the senses instruments of the thinking part of man. Plato's Socrates says this kind of thinking is not a kind of sense at all. Aristotle, trying to give a more general account of the souls of all animals, not just humans, moved the act of perception out of the rational thinking soul into this , which is something like a sense, and something like thinking, but not rational.

The passage is difficult to interpret and there is little consensus about the details.  has argued that this may be because Aristotle did not use the term as a standardized technical term at all. For example, in some passages in his works, Aristotle seems to use the term to refer to the individual sense perceptions simply being common to all people, or common to various types of animals. There is also difficulty with trying to determine whether the common sense is truly separable from the individual sense perceptions and from imagination, in anything other than a conceptual way as a capability. Aristotle never fully spells out the relationship between the common sense and the imaginative faculty, although the two clearly work together in animals, and not only humans, for example in order to enable a perception of time. They may even be the same. Despite hints by Aristotle himself that they were united, early commentators such as Alexander of Aphrodisias and Al-Farabi felt they were distinct, but later, Avicenna emphasized the link, influencing future authors including Christian philosophers.  argues that Aristotle used the term "common sense" both to discuss the individual senses when these act as a unity, which Gregorić calls "the perceptual capacity of the soul", or the higher level "sensory capacity of the soul" that represents the senses and the imagination working as a unity. According to Gregorić, there appears to have been a standardization of the term  as a term for the perceptual capacity (not the higher level sensory capacity), which occurred by the time of Alexander of Aphrodisias at the latest.

It works with images coming from the common sense and imagination, using reasoning as well as the active intellect. The  identifies the true forms of things, while the common sense identifies shared aspects of things. Though scholars have varying interpretations of the details, Aristotle's "common sense" was in any case not rational, in the sense that it implied no ability to explain the perception. Reason or rationality exists only in man according to Aristotle, and yet some animals can perceive "common perceptibles" such as change and shape, and some even have imagination according to Aristotle. Plato, on the other hand was apparently willing to allow that animals could have some level of thought, meaning that he did not have to explain their sometimes complex behavior with a strict division between high-level perception processing and the human-like thinking such as being able to form opinions. Therefore, in Aristotle (and the medieval Aristotelians) the universals used to identify and categorize things are divided into two.

(According to Gregorić, this is specifically in contexts where it refers to the higher order common sense that includes imagination.) Augustine and some of the Arab writers, also called it the "inner sense". The concept of the inner senses, plural, was further developed in the Middle Ages. Under the influence of the great Persian philosophers Al-Farabi and Avicenna, several inner senses came to be listed. "Thomas Aquinas and John of Jandun recognized four internal senses: the common sense, imagination, and memory. Avicenna, followed by Robert Grosseteste, Albert the Great, and Roger Bacon, argued for five internal senses: the common sense, imagination, fantasy, and memory." By the time of Descartes and Hobbes, in the 1600s, the inner senses had been standardized to five wits, which complemented the more well-known five "external" senses. Under this medieval scheme the common sense was understood to be seated not in the heart, as Aristotle had thought, but in the anterior Galenic ventricle of the brain. The anatomist Andreas Vesalius found no connections between the anterior ventricle and the sensory nerves, leading to speculation about other parts of the brain into the 1600s.

 writes that "In different ways the philosophers of medieval Latin and Arabic tradition, from Al-Farabi to Avicenna, Averroës, Albert, and Thomas, found in the De Anima and the Parva Naturalia the scattered elements of a coherent doctrine of the "central" faculty of the sensuous soul." It was "one of the most successful and resilient of Aristotelian notions".

Roman

"" is the Latin translation of the Greek , which came to be recovered by Medieval scholastics when discussing Aristotelian theories of perception. In the earlier Latin of the Roman empire, the term had taken a distinct ethical detour, developing new shades of meaning.
  is a term from Stoic philosophy, a Greek philosophy, influenced by Aristotle, and influential in Rome. This refers to shared notions, or common conceptions, that are either in-born or imprinted by the senses on to the soul. Unfortunately few true Stoic texts survive, and our understanding of their technical terminology is limited.
  is a term found in Epictetus (III.vi.8), a Stoic philosopher. C.S.  believed this to be close to a modern English meaning of "common sense", "the elementary mental outfit of the normal man", something like intelligence.
  is found only in the work of the emperor Marcus Aurelius (Meditations I.16), also known as a Stoic. He uses the word on its own in a list of things he learned from his adopted father. He explained the change of meaning as being due to the specific way that Stoics understood perception and intellect, saying that one should "consider withal how small the distinction was in that Philosophy, between the  [conjecture], and the vulgar  [perception]; how generally Passion was by those Philosophers brought under the Head of Opinion".

Another link between Latin  and Aristotle's Greek was in rhetoric, a subject that Aristotle was the first to systematize. In rhetoric, a prudent speaker must take account of opinions that are widely held.

In his Rhetoric for example Aristotle mentions "" or "common beliefs", saying that "our proofs and arguments must rest on generally accepted principles, [...] when speaking of converse with the multitude". In a similar passage in his own work on rhetoric, De Oratore, Cicero wrote that "in oratory the very cardinal sin is to depart from the language of everyday life and the usage approved by the sense of the community." The sense of the community is in this case one translation of "" in the Latin of Cicero.

Whether the Latin writers such as Cicero deliberately used this Aristotelian term in a new more peculiarly Roman way, probably also influenced by Greek Stoicism, therefore remains a subject of discussion.  has proposed for example that the Roman republic maintained a very "oral" culture whereas in Aristotle's time rhetoric had come under heavy criticism from philosophers such as Socrates.  argues, in agreement with the 17th-century Earl of Shaftesbury, that the concept developed from the Stoic concept of ethical virtue, influenced by Aristotle, but emphasizing the role of both the individual perception, and shared communal understanding. But in any case a complex of ideas attached itself to the term, to be almost forgotten in the Middle Ages, and eventually returning into ethical discussion in 18th-century Europe, after Descartes.

As with other meanings of common sense, for the Romans of the classical era "it designates a sensibility shared by all, from which one may deduce a number of fundamental judgments, that need not, or cannot, be questioned by rational reflection". But even though Cicero did at least once use the term in a manuscript on Plato's Timaeus (concerning a primordial "sense, one and common for all [...] connected with nature"), he and other Roman authors did not normally use it as a technical term limited to discussion about sense perception, as Aristotle apparently had in De Anima, and as the Scholastics later would in the Middle Ages. This was a term that could be used by Romans to imply not only human nature, but also humane conduct, good breeding, refined manners, and so on. Apart from Cicero, Quintilian, Lucretius, Seneca, Horace and some of the most influential Roman authors influenced by Aristotle's rhetoric and philosophy used the Latin term "" in a range of such ways. As C. S. Lewis wrote:

Compared to Aristotle and his strictest medieval followers, these Roman authors were not so strict about the boundary between animal-like common sense and specially human reasoning. In other words, these Romans allowed that people could have animal-like shared understandings of reality, not just in terms of memories of sense perceptions, but in terms of the way they would tend to explain things, and in the language they use.

Cartesian

One of the last notable philosophers to accept something like the Aristotelian "common sense" was Descartes in the 17th century, but he also undermined it. He described this inner faculty when writing in Latin in his Meditations on first philosophy. The common sense is the link between the body and its senses, and the true human mind, which according to Descartes must be purely immaterial. Unlike Aristotle, who had placed it in the heart, by the time of Descartes this faculty was thought to be in the brain, and he located it in the pineal gland. Descartes' judgement of this common sense was that it was enough to persuade the human consciousness of the existence of physical things, but often in a very indistinct way. To get a more distinct understanding of things, it is more important to be methodical and mathematical. This line of thought was taken further, if not by Descartes himself then by those he influenced, until the concept of a faculty or organ of common sense was itself rejected.

In contrast to Descartes who "found it unacceptable to assume that sensory representations may enter the mental realm from without"...

But Descartes used two different terms in his work, not only the Latin term "", but also the French term , with which he opens his Discourse on Method. And this second concept survived better. This work was written in French, and does not directly discuss the Aristotelian technical theory of perception.  is the equivalent of modern English "common sense" or "good sense".

 writes that "Descartes is the source of the most common meaning of common sense today: practical judgment". Gilson noted that Descartes actually gave  two related meanings, first the basic and widely shared ability to judge true and false, which he also calls ; and second, wisdom, the perfected version of the first. Descartes was being original.

The idea that now became influential, developed in both the Latin and French works of Descartes, though coming from different directions, is that common good sense (and indeed sense perception) is not reliable enough for the new Cartesian method of skeptical reasoning. The Cartesian project to replace common good sense with clearly defined mathematical reasoning was aimed at certainty, and not mere probability. It was promoted further by people such as Hobbes, Spinoza, and others and continues to have important impacts on everyday life. In France, the Netherlands, Belgium, Spain and Italy, it was in its initial florescence associated with the administration of Catholic empires of the competing Bourbon, and Habsburg dynasties, both seeking to centralize their power in a modern way, responding to Machiavellianism and Protestantism as part of the so-called counter reformation.
 So after Descartes, critical attention turned from Aristotle and his theory of perception, and more towards Descartes' own treatment of common good sense, concerning which several 18th-century authors found help in Roman literature.

The Enlightenment after Descartes

Epistemology: versus claims of certainty
During the Enlightenment, Descartes' insistence upon a mathematical-style method of thinking that treated common sense and the sense perceptions sceptically, was accepted in some ways, but also criticized. On the one hand, the approach of Descartes is and was seen as radically sceptical in some ways. On the other hand, like the Scholastics before him, while being cautious of common sense, Descartes was instead seen to rely too much on undemonstrable metaphysical assumptions in order to justify his method, especially in its separation of mind and body (with the  linking them). Cartesians such as Henricus Regius, Geraud de Cordemoy, and Nicolas Malebranche realized that Descartes's logic could give no evidence of the "external world" at all, meaning it had to be taken on faith. Though his own proposed solution was even more controversial, Berkeley famously wrote that enlightenment requires a "revolt from metaphysical notions to the plain dictates of nature and common sense". Descartes and the Cartesian "rationalists", rejected reliance upon experience, the senses and inductive reasoning, and seemed to insist that certainty was possible. The alternative to induction, deductive reasoning, demanded a mathematical approach, starting from simple and certain assumptions. This in turn required Descartes (and later rationalists such as Kant) to assume the existence of innate or "" knowledge in the human mind—a controversial proposal.

In contrast to the rationalists, the "empiricists" took their orientation from Francis Bacon, whose arguments for methodical science were earlier than those of Descartes, and less directed towards mathematics and certainty. Bacon is known for his doctrine of the "idols of the mind", presented in his Novum Organum, and in his Essays described normal human thinking as biased towards believing in lies. But he was also the opponent of all metaphysical explanations of nature, or over-reaching speculation generally, and a proponent of science based on small steps of experience,  experimentation and methodical induction. So while agreeing upon the need to help common sense with a methodical approach, he also insisted that starting from common sense, including especially common sense perceptions, was acceptable and correct. He influenced Locke and Pierre Bayle, in their critique of metaphysics, and in 1733 Voltaire "introduced him as the "father" of the scientific method" to a French audience, an understanding that was widespread by 1750.

As mentioned above, in terms of the more general epistemological implications of common sense, modern philosophy came to use the term common sense like Descartes, abandoning Aristotle's theory. While Descartes had distanced himself from it, John Locke abandoned it more openly, while still maintaining the idea of "common sensibles" that are perceived. But then George Berkeley abandoned both. David Hume agreed with Berkeley on this, and like Locke and Vico saw himself as following Bacon more than Descartes. In his synthesis, which he saw as the first Baconian analysis of man (something the lesser known Vico had claimed earlier), common sense is entirely built up from shared experience and shared innate emotions, and therefore it is indeed imperfect as a basis for any attempt to know the truth or to make the best decision. But he defended the possibility of science without absolute certainty, and consistently described common sense as giving a valid answer to the challenge of extreme skepticism. Concerning such sceptics, he wrote:

Ethics: "humanist"

Once Thomas Hobbes and Spinoza had applied Cartesian approaches to political philosophy, concerns about the inhumanity of the deductive approach of Descartes increased. With this in mind, Shaftesbury and Giambattista Vico presented new arguments for the importance of the Roman understanding of common sense, in what is now often referred to, after Hans-Georg Gadamer, as a humanist interpretation of the term. Their concern had several inter-related aspects. One ethical concern was the deliberately simplified method that treated human communities as made up of selfish independent individuals (methodological individualism), ignoring the sense of community that the Romans understood as part of common sense. Another connected epistemological concern was that by considering common good sense as inherently inferior to Cartesian conclusions developed from simple assumptions, an important type of wisdom was being arrogantly ignored.

The Earl's seminal 1709 essay Sensus Communis: An Essay on the Freedom of Wit and Humour was a highly erudite and influential defense of the use of irony and humour in serious discussions, at least among men of "Good Breeding". He drew upon authors such as Seneca, Juvenal, Horace and Marcus Aurelius, for whom, he saw, common sense was not just a reference to widely held vulgar opinions, but something cultivated among educated people living in better communities. One aspect of this, later taken up by authors such as Kant, was good taste. Another very important aspect of common sense particularly interesting to later British political philosophers such as Francis Hutcheson was what came to be called moral sentiment, which is different from a tribal or factional sentiment, but a more general fellow feeling that is very important for larger communities:

Hutcheson described it as, "a Publick Sense, viz. "our Determination to be pleased with the Happiness of others, and to be uneasy at their Misery."" which, he explains, "was sometimes called  or Sensus Communis by some of the Antients".

A reaction to Shaftesbury in defense of the Hobbesian approach of treating communities as driven by individual self-interest, was not long coming in Bernard Mandeville's controversial works. Indeed, this approach was never fully rejected, at least in economics. And so despite the criticism heaped upon Mandeville and Hobbes by Adam Smith, Hutcheson's student and successor in Glasgow university, Smith made self-interest a core assumption within nascent modern economics, specifically as part of the practical justification for allowing free markets.

By the late enlightenment period in the 18th century, the communal sense had become the "moral sense" or "moral sentiment" referred to by Hume and Adam Smith, the latter writing in plural of the "moral sentiments" with the key one being sympathy, which was not so much a public spirit as such, but a kind of extension of self-interest. Jeremy Bentham gives a summary of the plethora of terms used in British philosophy by the nineteenth century to describe common sense in discussions about ethics:
 This was at least to some extent opposed to the Hobbesian approach, still today normal in economic theory, of trying to understand all human behaviour as fundamentally selfish, and would also be a foil to the new ethics of Kant. This understanding of a moral sense or public spirit remains a subject for discussion, although the term "common sense" is no longer commonly used for the sentiment itself. In several European languages, a separate term for this type of common sense is used.

According to Gadamer, at least in French and British philosophy a moral element in appeals to common sense (or ), such as found in Reid, remains normal to this day. " was understood as a purely theoretical judgment, parallel to moral consciousness (conscience) and taste." The concept of  "was emptied and intellectualized by the German enlightenment". But German philosophy was becoming internationally important at this same time.

Gadamer notes one less-known exception—the Württemberg pietism, inspired by the 18th century Swabian churchman, M. Friedrich Christoph Oetinger, who appealed to Enlightenment figures in his critique of the Cartesian rationalism of Leibniz and Wolff, who were the most important German philosophers before Kant.

Giambattista Vico

Vico, who taught classical rhetoric in Naples (where Shaftesbury died) under a Cartesian-influenced Spanish government, was not widely read until the 20th century, but his writings on common sense have been an important influence upon Hans-Georg Gadamer, Benedetto Croce and Antonio Gramsci. Vico united the Roman and Greek meanings of the term . Vico's initial use of the term, which was of much inspiration to Gadamer for example, appears in his On the Study Methods of our Time, which was partly a defense of his own profession, given the reformist pressure upon both his University and the legal system in Naples. It presents common sense as something adolescents need to be trained in if they are not to "break into odd and arrogant behaviour when adulthood is reached", whereas teaching Cartesian method on its own harms common sense and stunts intellectual development. Rhetoric and elocution are not just for legal debate, but also educate young people to use their sense perceptions and their perceptions more broadly, building a fund of remembered images in their imagination, and then using ingenuity in creating linking metaphors, in order to make enthymemes. Enthymemes are reasonings about uncertain truths and probabilities—as opposed to the Cartesian method, which was skeptical of all that could not be dealt with as syllogisms, including raw perceptions of physical bodies. Hence common sense is not just a "guiding standard of eloquence" but also "the standard of practical judgment".

Vico proposed his own anti-Cartesian methodology for a new Baconian science, inspired, he said, by Plato, Tacitus, Francis Bacon and Grotius. In this he went further than his predecessors concerning the ancient certainties available within vulgar common sense. What is required, according to his new science, is to find the common sense shared by different people and nations. He made this a basis for a new and better-founded approach to discuss Natural Law, improving upon Grotius, John Selden, and Pufendorf who he felt had failed to convince, because they could claim no authority from nature. Unlike Grotius, Vico went beyond looking for one single set of similarities amongst nations but also established rules about how natural law properly changes as peoples change, and has to be judged relative to this state of development. He thus developed a detailed view of an evolving wisdom of peoples. Ancient forgotten wisdoms, he claimed, could be re-discovered by analysis of languages and myths formed under the influence of them. This is comparable to both Montesquieu's Spirit of the Laws, as well as much later Hegelian historicism, both of which apparently developed without any awareness of Vico's work.

Thomas Reid and the Scottish school

Contemporary with Hume, but critical of Hume's scepticism, a so-called Scottish school of Common Sense formed, whose basic principle was enunciated by its founder and greatest figure, Thomas Reid:

Thomas Reid was a successor to Francis Hutcheson and Adam Smith as Professor of Moral Philosophy, Glasgow. While Reid's interests lay in the defense of common sense as a type of self-evident knowledge available to individuals, this was also part of a defense of natural law in the style of Grotius. He believed his use of "common sense" encompassed both the communal common sense described by Shaftesbury and Hutcheson, and the perceptive powers described by Aristotelians.

Reid was criticised, partly for his critique of Hume, by Kant and J. S. Mill, who were two of the most important influences in nineteenth century philosophy. He was blamed for over-stating Hume's scepticism of commonly held beliefs, and more importantly for not perceiving the problem with any claim that common sense could ever fulfill Cartesian (or Kantian) demands for absolute knowledge. Reid furthermore emphasized inborn common sense as opposed to only experience and sense perception. In this way his common sense has a similarity to the assertion of  knowledge asserted by rationalists like Descartes and Kant, despite Reid's criticism of Descartes concerning his theory of ideas. Hume was critical of Reid on this point.

Despite the criticism, the influence of the Scottish school was notable for example upon American pragmatism, and modern Thomism.

Kant: In aesthetic taste

Kant saw this concept as answering a particular need in his system: "the question of why aesthetic judgments are valid: since aesthetic judgments are a perfectly normal function of the same faculties of cognition involved in ordinary cognition, they will have the same universal validity as such ordinary acts of cognition".

But Kant's overall approach was very different from those of Hume or Vico. Like Descartes, he rejected appeals to uncertain sense perception and common sense (except in the very specific way he describes concerning aesthetics), or the prejudices of one's "", and tried to give a new way to certainty through methodical logic, and an assumption of a type of  knowledge. He was also not in agreement with Reid and the Scottish school, who he criticized in his Prolegomena to Any Future Metaphysics as using "the magic wand of common sense", and not properly confronting the "metaphysical" problem defined by Hume, which Kant wanted to be solved scientifically—the problem of how to use reason to consider how one ought to act.

According to Gadamer, in contrast to the "wealth of meaning" brought from the Roman tradition into humanism, Kant "developed his moral philosophy in explicit opposition to the doctrine of 'moral feeling' that had been worked out in English philosophy". The moral imperative "cannot be based on feeling, not even if one does not mean an individual's feeling but common moral sensibility". For Kant, the  only applied to taste, and the meaning of taste was also narrowed as it was no longer understood as any kind of knowledge. Taste, for Kant, is universal only in that it results from "the free play of all our cognitive powers", and is communal only in that it "abstracts from all subjective, private conditions such as attractiveness and emotion".

Kant himself did not see himself as a relativist, and was aiming to give knowledge a more solid basis, but as Richard J. Bernstein remarks, reviewing this same critique of Gadamer:

Contemporary philosophy

Epistemology
Continuing the tradition of Reid and the enlightenment generally, the common sense of individuals trying to understand reality continues to be a serious subject in philosophy. In America, Reid influenced C. S. Peirce, the founder of the philosophical movement now known as Pragmatism, which has become internationally influential. One of the names Peirce used for the movement was "Critical Common-Sensism". Peirce, who wrote after Charles Darwin, suggested that Reid and Kant's ideas about inborn common sense could be explained by evolution. But while such beliefs might be well adapted to primitive conditions, they were not infallible, and could not always be relied upon.

Another example still influential today is from G. E. Moore, several of whose essays, such as the 1925 "A Defence of Common Sense", argued that individuals can make many types of statements about what they judge to be true, and that the individual and everyone else knows to be true. Michael Huemer has advocated an epistemic theory he calls phenomenal conservatism, which he claims to accord with common sense by way of internalist intuition.

Ethics: what the community would think
The theme of this discussion questions how far the understanding of eloquent rhetorical discussion (in the case of Vico), or communally sensitive aesthetic tastes (in the case of Kant) can give a standard or model for political, ethical and legal discussion in a world where forms of relativism are commonly accepted, and serious dialogue between very different nations is essential. Some philosophers such as Jacques Rancière indeed take the lead from Jean-François Lyotard and refer to the "postmodern" condition as one where there is "".

Thus she created a "Kantian" political philosophy, which, as she said herself, Kant did not write. Arendt and also Jürgen Habermas, who took a similar position concerning Kant's , were criticised by Lyotard for their use of Kant's  as a standard for real political judgement. Lyotard also saw Kant's  as an important concept for understanding political judgement, not aiming at any consensus, but rather at a possibility of a "euphony" in "dis-sensus". Lyotard claimed that any attempt to impose any  in real politics would mean imposture by an empowered faction upon others.

In a parallel development, Antonio Gramsci, Benedetto Croce, and later Hans-Georg Gadamer took inspiration from Vico's understanding of common sense as a kind of wisdom of nations, going beyond Cartesian method. It has been suggested that Gadamer's most well-known work, Truth and Method, can be read as an "extended meditation on the implications of Vico's defense of the rhetorical tradition in response to the nascent methodologism that ultimately dominated academic enquiry". In the case of Gadamer, this was in specific contrast to the  concept in Kant, which he felt (in agreement with Lyotard) could not be relevant to politics if used in its original sense.

Gadamer came into direct debate with his contemporary Habermas, the so-called . Habermas, with a self-declared Enlightenment "prejudice against prejudice" argued that if breaking free from the restraints of language is not the aim of dialectic, then social science will be dominated by whoever wins debates, and thus Gadamer's defense of  effectively defends traditional prejudices. Gadamer argued that being critical requires being critical of prejudices including the prejudice against prejudice. Some prejudices will be true. And Gadamer did not share Habermas' acceptance that aiming at going beyond language through method was not itself potentially dangerous. Furthermore, he insisted that because all understanding comes through language, hermeneutics has a claim to universality. As Gadamer wrote in the "Afterword" of Truth and Method, "I find it frighteningly unreal when people like Habermas ascribe to rhetoric a compulsory quality that one must reject in favor of unconstrained, rational dialogue".

Paul Ricoeur argued that Gadamer and Habermas were both right in part. As a hermeneutist like Gadamer he agreed with him about the problem of lack of any perspective outside of history, pointing out that Habermas himself argued as someone coming from a particular tradition. He also agreed with Gadamer that hermeneutics is a "basic kind of knowing on which others rest". But he felt that Gadamer under-estimated the need for a dialectic that was critical and distanced, and attempting to go behind language.

A recent commentator on Vico, John D. Schaeffer has argued that Gadamer's approach to  exposed itself to the criticism of Habermas because it "privatized" it, removing it from a changing and oral community, following the Greek philosophers in rejecting true communal rhetoric, in favour of forcing the concept within a Socratic dialectic aimed at truth. Schaeffer claims that Vico's concept provides a third option to those of Habermas and Gadamer and he compares it to the recent philosophers Richard J. Bernstein, Bernard Williams, Richard Rorty, and Alasdair MacIntyre, and the recent theorist of rhetoric, Richard Lanham.

"Moral sense" as opposed to "rationality"
The other Enlightenment debate about common sense, concerning common sense as a term for an emotion or drive that is unselfish, also continues to be important in discussion of social science, and especially economics. The axiom that communities can be usefully modeled as a collection of self-interested individuals is a central assumption in much of modern mathematical economics, and mathematical economics has now come to be an influential tool of political decision making.

While the term "common sense" had already become less commonly used as a term for the empathetic moral sentiments by the time of Adam Smith, debates continue about methodological individualism as something supposedly justified philosophically for methodological reasons (as argued for example by Milton Friedman and more recently by Gary S. Becker, both members of the so-called Chicago school of economics). As in the Enlightenment, this debate therefore continues to combine debates about not only what the individual motivations of people are, but also what can be known about scientifically, and what should be usefully assumed for methodological reasons, even if the truth of the assumptions are strongly doubted. Economics and social science generally have been criticized as a refuge of Cartesian methodology. Hence, amongst critics of the methodological argument for assuming self-centeredness in economics are authors such as Deirdre McCloskey, who have taken their bearings from the above-mentioned philosophical debates involving Habermas, Gadamer, the anti-Cartesian Richard Rorty and others, arguing that trying to force economics to follow artificial methodological laws is bad, and it is better to recognize social science as driven by rhetoric.

Catholic theology
Among Catholic theologians, writers such as theologian François Fénelon and philosopher Claude Buffier (1661–1737) gave an anti-Cartesian defense of common sense as a foundation for knowledge. Other Catholic theologians took up this approach, and attempts were made to combine this with more traditional Thomism, for example Jean-Marie de Lamennais. This was similar to the approach of Thomas Reid, who for example was a direct influence on Théodore Jouffroy. This meant basing knowledge upon something uncertain, and irrational. In the twentieth century, this debate is especially associated with Étienne Gilson and Reginald Garrigou-Lagrange. Gilson pointed out that Liberatore's approach means categorizing such common beliefs as the existence of God or the immortality of the soul, under the same heading as (in Aristotle and Aquinas) such logical beliefs as that it is impossible for something to exist and not exist at the same time. This, according to Gilson, is going beyond the original meaning. Concerning Liberatore he wrote:

Gilson argued that Thomism avoided the problem of having to decide between Cartesian innate certainties and Reid's uncertain common sense, and that "as soon as the problem of the existence of the external world was presented in terms of common sense, Cartesianism was accepted".

Projects 
 McCarthy's advice-taker proposal of 1958 represents an early proposal to use logic for representing common-sense knowledge in mathematical logic and using an automated theorem prover to derive answers to questions expressed in logical form. Compare Leibniz's calculus ratiocinator and characteristica universalis.
 The Cyc project attempts to provide a basis of common-sense knowledge for artificial-intelligence systems.
 The Open Mind Common Sense project resembles the Cyc project, except that it, like other on-line collaborative projects depends on the contributions of thousands of individuals across the World Wide Web.

Criticism 
Common sense has been criticized as nothing more than bias. Albert Einstein is believed to have said "Common sense is the collection of prejudices acquired by age eighteen" but the quote may be apocryphal.

See also

References

Bibliography

 . The Loeb Classical Library edition of 1986 used the 1936 translation of W.S Hett, and the standardised Greek text of August Immanuel Bekker. The more recent translation by Joe Sachs (see below) attempts to be more literal.
 
 
 
  Translated by Anthony Kenny. Descartes discusses his use of the notion of the common sense in the sixth meditation.
 . Translated by Stephen H. Voss.
 
 
 
 
 
 
 
 Stebbins, Robert A. Leisure's Legacy: Challenging the Common Sense View of Free Time. Basingstoke, UK: Palgrave Macmillan, 2017.
 Vico, Giambattista. On the Study Methods of our Time, trans. Elio Gianturco. Ithaca, NY: Cornell University Press, 1990.
 . Translated by Bergin and Fisch.

Further reading
 
 
 

Aristotelianism
Belief
Concepts in epistemology
Consensus reality
Folklore
German philosophy
Rhetoric